Human vasopressin, also called antidiuretic hormone (ADH),   arginine vasopressin (AVP) or argipressin, is a hormone synthesized from the AVP gene as a peptide prohormone in neurons in the hypothalamus, and is converted to AVP. It then travels down the axon terminating in the posterior pituitary, and is released from vesicles into the circulation in response to extracellular fluid hypertonicity (hyperosmolality). AVP has two primary functions. First, it increases the amount of solute-free water reabsorbed back into the circulation from the filtrate in the kidney tubules of the nephrons. Second, AVP constricts arterioles, which increases peripheral vascular resistance and raises arterial blood pressure.

A third function is possible. Some AVP may be released directly into the brain from the hypothalamus, and may play an important role in social behavior, sexual motivation and pair bonding, and maternal responses to stress.

Vasopressin induces differentiation of stem cells into cardiomyocytes and promotes heart muscle homeostasis.

It has a very short half-life, between 16 and 24 minutes.

Physiology

Function
Vasopressin regulates the  tonicity of body fluids. It is released from the posterior pituitary in response to hypertonicity and causes the kidneys to reabsorb solute-free water and return it to the circulation from the tubules of the nephron, thus returning the tonicity of the body fluids toward normal. An incidental consequence of this renal reabsorption of water is concentrated urine and reduced urine volume. AVP released in high concentrations may also raise blood pressure by inducing moderate vasoconstriction.

AVP also may have a variety of neurological effects on the brain. It may influence pair-bonding in voles. The high-density distributions of vasopressin receptor AVPr1a in prairie vole ventral forebrain regions have been shown to facilitate and coordinate reward circuits during partner preference formation, critical for pair bond formation.

A very similar substance, lysine vasopressin (LVP) or lypressin, has the same function in pigs and its synthetic version was used in human AVP deficiency, although it has been largely replaced by desmopressin.

Kidney
Vasopressin has three main effects which are:

 Increasing the water permeability of distal convoluted tubule (DCT) and cortical collecting tubules (CCT), as well as outer and inner medullary collecting duct (OMCD & IMCD) in the kidney, thus allowing water reabsorption and excretion of more concentrated urine, i.e., antidiuresis. This occurs through increased transcription and insertion of water channels (Aquaporin-2) into the apical membrane of collecting tubule and collecting duct epithelial cells. Aquaporins allow water to move down their osmotic gradient and out of the nephron, increasing the amount of water re-absorbed from the filtrate (forming urine) back into the bloodstream. This effect is mediated by V2 receptors. Vasopressin also increases the concentration of calcium in the collecting duct cells, by episodic release from intracellular stores.  Vasopressin, acting through cAMP, also increases transcription of the aquaporin-2 gene, thus increasing the total number of aquaporin-2 molecules in collecting duct cells.
 Increasing permeability of the inner medullary portion of the collecting duct to urea by regulating the cell surface expression of urea transporters, which facilitates its reabsorption into the medullary interstitium as it travels down the concentration gradient created by removing water from the connecting tubule, cortical collecting duct, and outer medullary collecting duct.
 Acute increase of sodium absorption across the ascending loop of Henle. This adds to the countercurrent multiplication which aids in proper water reabsorption later in the distal tubule and collecting duct.

Central nervous system

Vasopressin released within the brain may have several actions:
 Vasopressin is released into the brain in a circadian rhythm by neurons of the suprachiasmatic nucleus.
 Vasopressin released from posterior pituitary is associated with nausea.
 Recent evidence suggests that vasopressin may have analgesic effects.  The analgesia effects of vasopressin were found to be dependent on both stress and sex.

Regulation

Gene regulation 

Vasopressin is regulated by AVP gene expression which is managed by major clock controlled genes. In this circadian circuit known as the transcription-translation feedback loop (TTFL), Per2 protein accumulates and is phosphorylated by CK1E. Per2 subsequently inhibits the transcription factors Clock and BMAL1 in order to reduce Per2 protein levels in the cell. At the same time, Per2 also inhibits the transcription factors for the AVP gene in order to regulate its expression, the expression of vasopressin, and other AVP gene products.

Many factors influence the secretion of vasopressin:
 Ethanol (alcohol) reduces the calcium-dependent secretion of AVP by blocking voltage-gated calcium channels in neurohypophyseal nerve terminals in rats.
 Angiotensin II stimulates AVP secretion, in keeping with its general pressor and pro-volumic effects on the body.
 Atrial natriuretic peptide inhibits AVP secretion, in part by inhibiting Angiotensin II-induced stimulation of AVP secretion.
 Cortisol inhibits secretion of antidiuretic hormone.

Production and secretion
The physiologic stimulus for secretion of vasopressin is increased osmolality of the plasma, monitored by the hypothalamus. A decreased arterial blood volume, (such as can occur in cirrhosis, nephrosis and heart failure), stimulates secretion, even in the face of decreased osmolality of the plasma: it supersedes osmolality, but
with a milder effect. In other words, vasopressin is secreted in spite of the presence of hypoosmolality (hyponatremia) when the arterial blood volume is low.

The AVP that is measured in peripheral blood is almost all derived from secretion from the posterior pituitary gland (except in cases of AVP-secreting tumours). Vasopressin is produced by magnocellular neurosecretory neurons in the paraventricular nucleus of hypothalamus (PVN) and supraoptic nucleus (SON). It then travels down the axon through the infundibulum within neurosecretory granules that are found within Herring bodies, localized swellings of the axons and nerve terminals. These carry the peptide directly to the posterior pituitary gland, where it is stored until released into the blood.

There are other sources of AVP, beyond the hypothalamic magnocellular neurons.  For example, AVP is also synthesized by parvocellular neurosecretory neurons of the PVN, transported and released at the median eminence, from which it travels through the hypophyseal portal system to the anterior pituitary, where it stimulates corticotropic cells synergistically with CRH to produce ACTH (by itself it is a weak secretagogue).

Vasopressin during surgery and anaesthesia 
Vasopressin concentration is used to measure surgical stress for evaluation of surgical techniques. Plasma vasopressin concentration is elevated by noxious stimuli, predominantly during abdominal surgery, especially at gut manipulation, traction of viscera,  as well as abdominal insufflation with carbon dioxide during laparoscopic surgery.

Receptors 

Types of AVP receptors and their actions:

Structure and relation to oxytocin

The vasopressins are peptides consisting of nine amino acids (nonapeptides). The amino acid sequence of arginine vasopressin (argipressin) is Cys-Tyr-Phe-Gln-Asn-Cys-Pro-Arg-Gly-NH2, with the cysteine residues forming a disulfide bond and the C-terminus of the sequence converted to a primary amide.  Lysine vasopressin (lypressin) has a lysine in place of the arginine as the eighth amino acid, and is found in pigs and some related animals, whereas arginine vasopressin is found in humans.

The structure of oxytocin is very similar to that of the vasopressins: It is also a nonapeptide with a disulfide bridge and its amino acid sequence differs at only two positions. The two genes are located on the same chromosome separated by a relatively small distance of less than 15,000 bases in most species. The magnocellular neurons that secrete vasopressin are adjacent to magnocellular neurons that secrete oxytocin, and are similar in many respects. The similarity of the two peptides can cause some cross-reactions: oxytocin has a slight antidiuretic function, and high levels of AVP can cause uterine contractions.

Comparison of vasopressin and oxytocin neuropeptide families:

Medical use

Vasopressin is used to manage anti-diuretic hormone deficiency. Vasopressin is used to treat diabetes insipidus related to low levels of antidiuretic hormone. It is available as Pressyn.

Vasopressin has off-label uses and is used in the treatment of vasodilatory shock, gastrointestinal bleeding, ventricular tachycardia and ventricular fibrillation.

Vasopressin agonists are used therapeutically in various conditions, and its long-acting synthetic analogue desmopressin is used in conditions featuring low vasopressin secretion, as well as for control of bleeding (in some forms of von Willebrand disease and in mild haemophilia A) and in extreme cases of bedwetting by children. Terlipressin and related analogues are used as vasoconstrictors in certain conditions. Use of vasopressin analogues for esophageal varices commenced in 1970.

Vasopressin infusions are also used as second line therapy for septic shock patients not responding to fluid resuscitation or infusions of catecholamines (e.g., dopamine or norepinephrine) to increase the blood pressure while sparing the use of catecholamines. These argipressins have much shorter elimination half-life (around 20 minutes) comparing to synthetic non-arginine vasopresines with much longer elimination half-life of many hours. Further, argipressins act on V1a, V1b, and V2 receptors which consequently lead to higher eGFR and lower vascular resistance in the lungs.  A number of injectable arginine vasopressins are currently in clinical use in the United States and in Europe.

Pharmacokinetics
Vasopressin is administered through an intravenous device, intramuscular injection or a subcutaneous injection. The duration of action depends on the mode of administration and ranges from thirty minutes to two hours. It has a half life of ten to twenty minutes. It is widely distributed throughout the body and remains in the extracellular fluid. It is degraded by the liver and excreted through the kidneys. Arginin vasopressins for use in septic shock are intended for intravenous use only.

Side effects 
The most common side effects during treatment with vasopressin are dizziness, angina, chest pain, abdominal cramps, heartburn, nausea, vomiting, trembling, fever, water intoxication, pounding sensation in the head, diarrhoea, sweating, paleness, and flatulence. The most severe adverse reactions are myocardial infarction and hypersensitivity.

Contraindications
The use of lysine vasopressin is contraindicated in the presence of hypersensitivity to beef or pork proteins, increased BUN and chronic kidney failure. It is recommended that it be cautiously used in instances of perioperative polyuria, sensitivity to the drug, asthma, seizures, heart failure, a comatose state, migraine headaches, and cardiovascular disease.

Interactions
 alcohol - may lower the antidiuretic effect
 carbamazepine, chloropropamide, clofibrate, tricyclic antidepressants and fludrocortisone may raise the diuretic effect
 lithium, demeclocycline, heparin or norepinephrine may lower the antidiuretic effect
 vasopressor effect may be higher with the concurrent use of ganglionic blocking medications

Deficiency
Decreased AVP release (neurogenic — i.e. due to alcohol intoxication or tumour) or decreased renal sensitivity to AVP (nephrogenic, i.e. by mutation of V2 receptor or AQP) leads to diabetes insipidus, a condition featuring hypernatremia (increased blood sodium concentration), polyuria (excess urine production), and polydipsia (thirst).

Excess

Syndrome of Inappropriate Antidiuretic Hormone secretion (SIADH) in turn can be caused by a number of problems. Some forms of cancer can cause SIADH, particularly small cell lung carcinoma but also a number of other tumors. A variety of diseases affecting the brain or the lung (infections, bleeding) can be the driver behind SIADH. A number of drugs have been associated with SIADH, such as certain antidepressants (serotonin reuptake inhibitors and tricyclic antidepressants), the anticonvulsant carbamazepine, oxytocin (used to induce and stimulate labor), and the chemotherapy drug vincristine. It has also been associated with fluoroquinolones (including ciprofloxacin and moxifloxacin). Finally, it can occur without a clear explanation. Hyponatremia can be treated pharmaceutically through the use of vasopressin receptor antagonists.

History
Vasopressin was elucidated and synthesized for the first time by Vincent du Vigneaud.

Animal studies 
Evidence for an effect of AVP on monogamy vs polygamy comes from experimental studies in several species, which indicate that the precise distribution of vasopressin and vasopressin receptors in the brain is associated with species-typical patterns of social behavior. In particular, there are consistent differences between monogamous species and polygamous species in the distribution of AVP receptors, and sometimes in the distribution of vasopressin-containing axons, even when closely related species are compared.

Human studies 
Vasopressin has shown nootropic effects on pain perception and cognitive function. Vasopressin also plays a role in autism, major depressive disorder, bipolar disorder, and schizophrenia.

See also 
 Syndrome of Inappropriate Antidiuretic Hormone secretion (SIADH)
 Oxytocin
 Vasopressin receptor
 Vasopressin receptor antagonists
 Copeptin
 Anterior Pituitary
 Hypothalamus

References

Further reading 

 

Neuropeptides
Posterior pituitary hormones
Neuroendocrinology
Renal physiology
Vasopressin receptor agonists
Orgasm
Antidiuretics